SECAN, Société d'Etudes et de Construction Aéro-Navales was a French aircraft manufacturer, a branch of the Société des usines Chausson (SUC).

Aircraft
 SECAN Courlis (1946)

External links
 SECAN SUC 10 'Courlis'

Defunct aircraft manufacturers of France